The Gush Etzion Regional Council (Mo'atza Azorit Gush Etzion) is a regional council in the northern Judean Hills, the northern part of the southern area of the West Bank, administering the settlements in the Gush Etzion region, as well as others nearby. The headquarters are located adjacent to Alon Shvut.

The current mayor of the Council is Shlomo Ne'eman, elected on 14 February 2017.

In August 2021, Rabbi Yosef Zvi Rimon was elected Chief Rabbi of the Gush Etzion Regional Council.

List of settlements
This regional council provides various municipal services for the following Israeli settlements within its territory:

Historic Gush Etzion:
 Alon Shvut
 Bat Ayin
 Carmei Tzur
 Gvaot
 Elazar
 Har Gilo
 Kfar Etzion (kibbutz)
 Migdal Oz (kibbutz)
 Neve Daniel
 Rosh Tzurim (kibbutz)

Judean Mountains:
 Ibei Hanachal
 Kedar
 Kfar Eldad
 Ma'ale Amos
 Ma'ale Rehav'am
 Metzad
 Nokdim (El David)
 Pnei Kedem
 Tekoa

All of the settlements in the historic Gush Etzion area are on the Israeli side of the West Bank Barrier, except for Carmei Tzur. None of the settlements in the Judean Mountains area are, except for Kedar which is located far north of the others very close to Maale Adummim and is within the eastern Jerusalem section of the barrier.

References

External links
  
 English website

 
Israeli regional councils in the West Bank
Gush Etzion